The railway line between Reims and Laon (French: Ligne de Reims à Laon) is a French 52 km long railway located in the departments of the Marne and Aisne. The line connects the communes of Reims and Laon along with seven intermediary stops. It consists of line number 082 000 of the réseau ferré national.

Route 
In addition to its termini stations, the Reims–Laon railway serves the following SNCF stations:

 Reims station
 Courcy-Brimont station
 Loivre station
 Aguilcourt—Variscourt halt
 Guignicourt station
 Amifontaine station
 Saint-Erme station
 Coucy-lès-Eppes station
 Laon station

Train services 
As of 2020, the entirety of the route is served by TER Grand Est line 10.

References 

Railway lines in Grand Est
Railway lines in Hauts-de-France